Iqbal Qaiser is Pakistani Punjabi writer, historian and cultural activist. He is founder of Punjabi Khoj Garh, Kasur. He is a Punjabi nationalist and researcher of Sikh heritage in Pakistan.

References

External links 
 

Living people
Punjabi people
Year of birth missing (living people)
21st-century Pakistani historians